Polska Wieś may refer to the following places:
Polska Wieś, Gniezno County in Greater Poland Voivodeship (west-central Poland)
Polska Wieś, Poznań County in Greater Poland Voivodeship (west-central Poland)
Polska Wieś, Warmian-Masurian Voivodeship (north Poland)